Adanaspor is a Turkish professional football club based in Adana, currently performing at the TFF First League. The club is founded in 1954 by the middle-class merchants and artisans in response to the alienation within city's then most popular club, Adana Demirspor, who were supported by workers, financed by landowners and governed by TCDD staff. Having played their first game in 1956 and became known as Adana derby, both clubs compete for the citywide support and domination since then. Adanaspor jersey colors, orange-white, symbolizes orange and cotton, the main harvests and believed by the club fans to be the true representation of the city. Adanaspor shares the New Adana Stadium as homeground with their archrival.

Adanaspor were one of the most successful clubs of Turkish Football League in 1970s and early 1980s. Toros Kaplanları (Taurus Tigers) were the Runners-up at the 1980-81 season, having participated at the top division for total of 22 years. The club also competed at the UEFA Cup for three years.

History

A club under the name of Adanaspor was first founded in 1932 and competed in the Adana Amateur League. Orhan Kemal pen named internationally known novelist Mehmet Raşit Öğütçü was one of the first players of this club.

Current Adanaspor were founded on January 23, 1954 by Mehmet Şanlıtürk, Mustafa Bekbaş, Erol Erk, Ali Gedikbaş and Dr. Muzaffer Eraslan. The clubs' original colours were yellow and navy. They competed in the amateur league until 1966. Adanaspor merged with Akinspor and Torosspor in order to become a fully professional club. They were admitted into the 2. Lig (Second Division) in their first season as a professional club. After the merge, they changed their colours to orange and white.

The club competed in the 2. Lig until they earned promotion to the 1. Lig (Süper Lig) at the conclusion of the 1970–71 season. They won their first cup, the Gençlik ve Spor Bakanlığı Kupası in 1973. Adanaspor defeated İzmir Denizgücü 2–0 in the final, with Behçet Arkun and Orhan Yalçınkaya scoring the goals. They spent thirteen straight years in the 1. Lig, from 1971–84, competing in the UEFA Cup three times and the Balkans Cup once.

Adanaspor finished fourth at the end of 1975–76 season, their highest finish in the top-flight at the time. They went on to best their record, finishing second in 1980–81. They were relegated for the first time in 1984, but earned promotion back in 1988 after winning the 2. Lig. However, due to financial troubles, the club could not keep up their level of performance and were relegated back to the 2. Lig at the end of the 1990–91 season.

The club spent the next several years bouncing back and forth between leagues. The club spiraled out of control in the mid-2000s, declaring bankruptcy in 2005. They were relegated three times in a row, ending up in the 3. Lig (Fourth Division) in 2006. However, they earned double promotion in 2006–07 and 2007–08. They had been competing in the 1. Lig (Second Division) until 2016, narrowly missing out on promotion to the Süper Lig at the end of the 2009–10 season.

Adanaspor finished 6th 1st League in 2011–12 season and qualified to Promotion Play-offs. They defeated Çaykur Rizespor with a 4–1 aggregate but were beaten by Kasımpaşa a 3–2 score (normal time score was 2–2) after extra time and missed return to top level. Finally Adanaspor guaranteed to return Süper Lig after defeating Gaziantep BB as 3–2 at away match coming from 0–2 deficit on 24 April 2016.

Stadium and the facilities

Adanaspor play their home matches at the New Adana Stadium in Sarıçam district since February 2021. South side of the stadium are designated for Adanaspor fans and are painted to orange and white. The stadium has a seating capacity of 33,543 and it is shared with Adana Demirspor. The club played their home games at the 5 Ocak Stadium from 1954 to 2021.

Professional football team training ground is the Çatalan Tesisleri, 25 km north of the city, in the Karaisalı district. The facility has 4 football fields, swimming pool, fitness center and staff-player residences. The main facility for the youth teams is the Osman Yereşen Facility in the Çukurova district. The facility has two pitch and a residence building. Some age groups of the youth team train at the Gündüz Tekin Onay training facility, which is also in Çukurova district.

Supporters and rivalries

Adanaspor are traditionally supported by the merchants and artisans of the city. Until the change in the club management in early 2000s, Adanaspor had a loyal fan base and had spectator average of 10000 to 15000 at every game. Since the club converted into a one-owner private company, although they continued to be supported at a good season, level of loyalty diminished sharply. During the seasons in which Adanaspor had poor results, average number of spectators fell down to 1500, way below the averages of the years from 1970 to 2000.

Adanaspor's main supporters group is "Turbeyler". Their permanent location at the 5 Ocak Stadium is the GKA (South Stands) which they call it the 'Arjantin Köşe' (en:Argentine Corner). Before 2000s at the derby matches, the West and the large East stand were shared equally by Adana Demir and Adanaspor fans, Adana Demir fans settle at the north seats of these Stands and Adanaspor fans settle at the south section. Since 2000s, the entire West and East Stands were open only to the fans of the official host of the derby match. When Adana Demirspor is hosting, Adanaspor fans are only allowed to the 1600-seat South Stand and when Adanaspor is hosting, Adana Demirspor fans are only allowed to the 1600-seat North Stand.

Honours
Süper Lig
Runners-up (1): 1980–81
Third Place (1): 1975–76
1. Lig
Winners (3):1970–71, 1987–88, 2015–16 
2. Lig
Runners-up (1): 2007–08
3. Lig
Winners (1): 2006–07

Competitions
 Adana League: 12 years/ 1954–66
Turkish Football League: 56 years/ 1966-
 First Tier (Süper Lig): 22 years/ 1971–84, 1988–91, 1998–01, 2002–04, 2016–2017
 Second Tier (1. Lig): 31 years/ 1966–71, 1984–88, 1991–98, 2001–02, 2004–05, 2008–16, 2017-
 Third Tier (2. Lig): 2 years/ 2005–06, 2007–08,
 Fourth Tier (3. Lig): 1 year/ 2006–07

European participations

P = Matches played; W = Matches won; D = Matches drawn; L = Matches lost; GF = Goals for; GA = Goals against; GD = Goals difference.

UEFA Cup/Europa League:

Balkans Cup:

UEFA ranking history:

Players

Current squad

Out on loan

Affiliated clubs
The following club(s) are currently affiliated with  Adanaspor:
  Beşiktaş J.K. (2015–present)

References

External links
Official website
Adanaspor on TFF.org
Adana

 
Sport in Adana
Adanaspor
Association football clubs established in 1954
1954 establishments in Turkey
Süper Lig clubs